Porphyry of Tyre (Porphýrios; , Furfūriyūs;  – ) was a Neoplatonic philosopher born in Tyre, Roman Phoenicia during Roman rule. He edited and published The Enneads, the only collection of the work of Plotinus, his teacher. His commentary on Euclid's Elements was used as a source by Pappus of Alexandria.

He wrote original works in the Greek language on a wide variety of topics, ranging from music theory to Homer to vegetarianism. His Isagoge or Introduction, an introduction to logic and philosophy, was the standard textbook on logic throughout the Middle Ages in its Latin and Arabic translations. Porphyry was, and still is, also well-known for his anti-Christian polemics. Through works such as Philosophy from Oracles and Against the Christians (which was banned by Constantine the Great), he was involved in a controversy with  early Christians.

Life 
The Suda (a 10th-century Byzantine encyclopedia based on many sources now lost) reports that Porphyry was born in Tyre. His parents named him Malkos or Malchus ("King" in the Semitic languages) though he changed it into the name "Basileus" ("King" in Greek), and into his nickname "Porphyrius" (lit. "Clad in purple") later in his life. In his work The Life of Plotinus he refers to Aramaic as his "native tongue." Under Cassius Longinus, in Athens, he studied grammar and rhetoric, and got acquainted with Middle Platonism.

In 262 he went to Rome, attracted by the reputation of Plotinus, and for six years devoted himself to the practice of Neoplatonism, during which time he severely modified his diet. At one point becoming suicidal. On the advice of Plotinus he went to live in Sicily for five years to recover his mental health. On returning to Rome, he lectured on philosophy and completed an edition of the writings of Plotinus (who had died in the meantime) together with a biography of his teacher. Iamblichus is mentioned in ancient Neoplatonic writings as his disciple, but this is most likely only meant to indicate that he was the dominant figure in the next generation of philosophers succeeding him. The two men differed publicly on the issue of theurgy.

In his later years, he married Marcella, a widow with seven children and an enthusiastic student of philosophy. Little more is known of his life, and the date of his death is uncertain.

Works

Introduction (Isagoge) 

Porphyry is best known for his contributions to philosophy. Apart from writing the Aids to the Study of the Intelligibles (Ἀφορμαὶ πρὸς τὰ νοητά; Sententiae Ad Intelligibilia Ducentes), a basic summary of Neoplatonism, he is especially appreciated for his Introduction to Categories (Introductio in Praedicamenta or Isagoge et in Aristotelis Categorias commentarium), a very short work often considered to be a commentary on Aristotle's Categories, hence the title. The Introduction describes how qualities attributed to things may be classified, famously breaking down the philosophical concept of substance into the five components genus, species, difference, property, accident.

As Porphyry's most influential contribution to philosophy, the Introduction to Categories incorporated Aristotle's logic into Neoplatonism, in particular the doctrine of the categories of being interpreted in terms of entities (in later philosophy, "universal"). Boethius' Isagoge, a Latin translation of Porphyry's "Introduction", became a standard medieval textbook in European schools and universities, which set the stage for medieval philosophical-theological developments of logic and the problem of universals. In medieval textbooks, the all-important Arbor porphyriana ("Porphyrian Tree") illustrates his logical classification of substance. To this day, taxonomy benefits from concepts in Porphyry's Tree, in classifying living organisms (see cladistics).

The Introduction was translated into Arabic by Abd-Allāh Ibn al-Muqaffaʿ from a Syriac version. With the Arabicized name Isāghūjī (إيساغوجي) it long remained the standard introductory logic text in the Muslim world and influenced the study of theology, philosophy, grammar, and jurisprudence. Besides the adaptations and epitomes of this work, many independent works on logic by Muslim philosophers have been entitled Isāghūjī. Porphyry's discussion of accident sparked a long-running debate on the application of accident and essence.

Philosophy from Oracles (De Philosophia ex Oraculis Haurienda) 
Porphyry is also known as an opponent of Christianity and defender of Paganism; his precise contribution to the philosophical approach to traditional religion may be discovered in the fragments of Philosophy from Oracles (Περὶ τῆς ἐκ λογίων φιλοσοφίας; De Philosophia ex Oraculis Haurienda), which was originally three books in length.  There is debate as to whether it was written in his youth (as Eunapius reports) or closer in time to the persecutions of Christians under Diocletian and Galerius.

Whether or not Porphyry was the pagan philosopher opponent in Lactantius' Divine Institutes, written at the time of the persecutions, has long been discussed. The fragments of the Philosophy from Oracles are only quoted by Christians, especially Eusebius, Theodoret, Augustine, and John Philoponus. The fragments contain oracles identifying proper sacrificial procedure, the nature of astrological fate, and other topics relevant for Greek and Roman religion in the third century.  Whether this work contradicts his treatise defending vegetarianism, which also warned the philosopher to avoid animal sacrifice, is disputed among scholars.

Against the Christians (Adversus Christianos) 

During his retirement in Sicily, Porphyry wrote Against the Christians (Κατὰ Χριστιανῶν; Adversus Christianos) which consisted of fifteen books. Some thirty Christian apologists, such as Methodius, Eusebius, Apollinaris, Augustine, Jerome, etc., responded to his challenge. In fact, everything known about Porphyry's arguments is found in these refutations, largely because Theodosius II ordered every copy burned in AD 435 and again in 448.

Augustine and the 5th-century ecclesiastical historian Socrates of Constantinople, assert that Porphyry was once a Christian.

Other subjects 
Porphyry was opposed to the theurgy of his disciple Iamblichus. Much of Iamblichus' mysteries is dedicated to the defense of mystic theurgic divine possession against the critiques of Porphyry. French philosopher Pierre Hadot maintains that for Porphyry, spiritual exercises are an essential part of spiritual development.

Porphyry was, like Pythagoras, an advocate of vegetarianism on spiritual and ethical grounds. These two philosophers are perhaps the most famous vegetarians of classical antiquity.

Porphyry also wrote widely on music theory, astrology, religion, and philosophy. He produced a History of Philosophy (Philosophos historia) with vitae of philosophers that included a life of his teacher, Plotinus. His life of Plato from book iv exists only in quotes by Cyril of Alexandria. His book Vita Pythagorae on the life of Pythagoras is not to be confused with the book of the same name by Iamblichus. His commentary on Ptolemy's Harmonics (Eis ta Harmonika Ptolemaiou hypomnēma) is an important source for the history of ancient harmonic theory.

Porphyry also wrote about Homer. Apart from several lost texts known only from quotations by other authors, two texts survive at least in large parts: the Homeric Questions (Homēriká zētḗmata, largely a philological comment on the Iliad and Odyssey) and On the Cave of the Nymphs in the Odyssey (Peri tou en Odysseia tōn nymphōn antrou).

List of works

Extant 
 Life of Plotinus. Editions: Luc Brisson, La Vie de Plotin. Histoire de l'antiquité classique 6 & 16, Paris: Librairie Philosophique J. Vrin: 1986–1992, 2 vols; A. H. Armstrong, Plotinus, Loeb Classical Library, Cambridge, Massachusetts: Harvard University Press, 1968, pp. 2–84. Translation: Neoplatonic Saints: The Lives of Plotinus and Proclus. Translated Texts for Historians 35 (Liverpool: Liverpool University Press, 2000).
 Life of Pythagoras. Edition: E. des Places, Vie de Pythagore, Lettre à Marcella, Paris: Les Belles Lettre, 1982.
 Introduction to Aristotle's Categories (Isagoge). Translations: E. Warren, Isagoge, Mediaeval Sources in Translation 16, Toronto: Pontifical Institute of Mediaeval Studies, 1975; J. Barnes, Porphyry's Introduction. Translation of the 'Isagoge' with a Commentary, Oxford, 2003; Steven K. Strange, Porphyry. On Aristotle's Categories, Ithaca, New York, 1992; Octavius Freire Owen, The Organon or Logical Treatises of Aristotle with the Introduction of Porphyry. Bohn's Classical Library 11–12, London: G. Bell, 1908–1910, 2 vols; Paul Vincent Spade, Five Texts on the Mediaeval Problem of Universals: Porphyry, Boethius, Abelard, Duns Scotus, Ockham, Indianapolis: Hackett, 1994.
 Introduction to the Tetrabiblos of Ptolemy. Editions: Stefan Weinstock, in: Franz Cumont (ed.), Catalogus Codicum astrologorum Graecorum, (Brussels, 1940): V.4, 187–228; Kommentar zur Harmonielehre des Ptolemaios Ingemar Düring. ed. (Göteborg: Elanders, 1932). Translation: James Herschel Holden, Porphyry the Philosopher, Introduction to the Tetrabiblos and Serapio of Alexandria, Astrological Definitions, Tempe, Az.: A.F.A., Inc., 2009.
 Against the Christians (Contra Christianos). Editions: A. Ramos Jurado, J. Ritoré Ponce, A. Carmona Vázquez, I. Rodríguez Moreno, J. Ortolá Salas, J. M. Zamora Calvo (eds), Contra los Cristianos: Recopilación de Fragmentos, Traducción, Introducción y Notas –  (Cádiz: Servicio de Publicaciones de la Universidad de Cádiz 2006); Adolf von Harnack, Porphyrius, "Gegen die Christen," 15 Bücher: Zeugnisse, Fragmente und Referate. Abhandlungen der königlich preussischen Akademie der Wissenschaften: Jahrgang 1916: philosoph.-hist. Klasse: Nr. 1 (Berlin: 1916). Translations: R. M. Berchman, Porphyry Against the Christians, Ancient Mediterranean and Medieval Texts and Contexts 1, Leiden: Brill, 2005; R. Joseph Hoffmann, Porphyry’s Against the Christians: The Literary Remains, Amherst: Prometheus Books, 1994.
 Commentary on Plato's Timaeus. Edition: A. R. Sodano, Porphyrii in Platonis Timaeum commentarium fragmenta, Napoli: 1964.
 Homeric Questions. Edition: The Homeric Questions: a Bilingual Edition – Lang Classical Studies 2, R. R. Schlunk, trans. (Frankfurt-am-Main: Lang, 1993).
 On the Cave of the Nymphs in the Odyssey (De antro nympharum). Edition: The Cave of the Nymphs in the Odyssey. A revised text with translation by Seminar Classics 609, State University of New York at Buffalo, Arethusa Monograph 1 (Buffalo: Dept. of Classics, State University of New York at Buffalo, 1969). Translation: Robert Lamberton, On the Cave of the Nymphs, Barrytown, N. Y.: Station Hill Press, 1983.
 On the abstinence of eating animals (De abstinentia ab esu animalium). Edition: Jean Bouffartigue, M. Patillon, and Alain-Philippe Segonds, edd., 3 vols., Budé (Paris, 1979–1995). Translation: Gillian Clark, On Abstinence from Killing Animals, Ithaca: Cornell University Press, 2000.
 On philosophy from oracles (De Philosophia ex oraculis haurienda). Edition: G. Wolff, Berlin: 1856; Porphyrii Philosophi fragmenta, ed. by Andrew Smith, Stuttgart and Leipzig, Teubner 1993.
 Aids to the Study of the Intelligibles (Sententiae ad Intelligibilia Ducentes). Edition: E. Lamberz, Leipzig: Teubner, 1975. Translation: K. Guthrie, Launching-Points to the Realm of Mind, Grand Rapids, Michigan, 1988.
 Letter to Marcella. Edition: Kathleen O’Brien Wicker, Porphyry, the Philosopher, to Marcella: Text and Translation with Introduction and Notes, Text and Translations 28; Graeco-Roman Religion Series 10 (Atlanata: Scholars Press, 1987); Pros Markellan Griechischer Text, herausgegeben, übersetzt, eingeleitet und erklärt von W. Pötscher (Leiden: E. J. Brill, 1969). Translation: Alice Zimmern, Porphyry's Letter to His Wife Marcella Concerning the Life of Philosophy and the Ascent to the Gods, Grand Rapids, Michigan, 1989.
 Letter to Anebo (Epistula ad Anebonem). Edition: A. R. Sodano, Naples: L'arte Tipografia: 1958.

 Lost 
 Ad Gedalium, a lost commentary on Aristotle's Categories in seven books. The testimonia are published in Andrew Smith (ed.), Porphyrius, Porphyrii Philosophi fragmenta. Fragmenta Arabica David Wasserstein interpretante, Berlin: Walter de Gruyter, 1993.A Treatise concerning the Secret Doctrines of the Philosophers. Mentioned by Eunapius according to John Toland in "Clidophorus, or of the Exoteric and Esoteric Philosophy."  Eunapius says that Porphyry "commended the medicine of perspicuity, and tasting it by experience, wrote "A Treatise concerning the Secret Doctrines of the Philosophers", which they involv'd in obscurity, as in the Fables of the Poets, but which he brought to light."
There is a fragment attributed to Porphyry in Shem-Tov ibn Falaquera's De'ot ha-Filusufim, from the 13th century. It is a Hebrew translation from an unknown Arabic translation of a lost work. Gad Freudenthal and Aaron Johnson tentatively accept its authenticity.

 Uncertain attribution 
 Ad Gaurum (of uncertain attribution). Edition: K. Kalbfleisch. Abhandlungen der Preussischen Akadamie der Wissenschaft. phil.-hist. kl. (1895): 33-62. Translation: J. Wilberding, To Gaurus On How Embryos are Ensouled, and On What is in our Power. Ancient Commentators on Aristotle Series, R. Sorabji (ed.), Bristol: Classical Press, 2011.
 #6 and #9 in Corpus dei Papiri Filosofici Greci e Latini III: Commentari – (Florence: Leo S. Olschki, 1995) may or may not be by Porphyry.

See also
Basilides of Tyre
Macarius Magnes – his work Apocriticus contains a series of excerpts from Porphyry's Against the Christians 4th century in Lebanon

 References 
 Notes 

Citations

 Sources

 
 

 Beutler, R. (1894–1980). "Porphyrios (21)" in A. Pauly, G. Wissowa, W. Kroll, K. Witte, K. Mittelhaus and K. Ziegler, eds., Paulys Realencyclopädie der classischen Altertumswissenschaft, vol. 22.1.

 

 also available at tertullian.org

 

 

 Editions 
 Translations of several fragments are contained in Appendix 1 of Religion and Identity in Porphyry of Tyre by Aaron Johnson (Cambridge, 2013).
 Select Works of Porphyry. Translated by T. Taylor (Guildford, 1994). Contains Abstinence from Eating Animal Food, the Sententiae and the Cave of the Nymphs.
 Fragments: Andrew Smith, Stvtgardiae et Lipsiae: B. G. Tevbneri, 1993.
 Opuscula selecta Augusts Nauck, ed. (Lipsiae: B. G. Tevbneri, 1886) (online at archive.org).

Further reading

 Bidez, J. (1913). Vie de Porphyre. Ghent.
 Clark, Gillian, "Porphyry of Tyre on the New Barbarians," in R. Miles (ed), Constructing Identities in Late Antiquity (London: Routledge, 1999), 112–132; = in Eadem, Body and Gender, Soul and Reason in Late Antiquity (Farnham; Burlington, VT, Ashgate, 2011) (Variorum collected studies series, CS978), art. XIV.
 Clark, Gillian, "Philosophic Lives and the philosophic life: Porphyry and Iamblichus," in T. Hägg and P. Rousseau (eds), Greek Biography and Panegyric in Late Antiquity (Berkeley and Los Angeles, University of California Press, 2000), 29–51; = in Eadem, Body and Gender, Soul and Reason in Late Antiquity (Farnham; Burlington, VT, Ashgate, 2011) (Variorum collected studies series, CS978), art. XV.
 Clark, Gillian, "Fattening the soul: Christian asceticism and Porphyry On Abstinence," Studia Patristica, 35, 2001, 41–51; = in Eadem, Body and Gender, Soul and Reason in Late Antiquity (Farnham; Burlington, VT, Ashgate, 2011) (Variorum collected studies series, CS978), art. XVI.
 Emilsson, E., "Porphyry". Retrieved April 19, 2009.
 Iamblichus: De mysteriis. Translated with an Introduction and Notes by Emma C. Clarke, John M. Dillon and Jackson P. Hershbell (Society of Biblical Literature; 2003) .
 Girgenti, G. (1987) Porfirio negli ultimi cinquant'anni: bibliografia sistematica e ragionata della letteratura primaria e secondaria riguardante il pensiero porfiriano e i suoi influssi storici Milan.
 Smith, Andrew (1987) Porphyrian Studies since 1913, in W. Haase, ed., Aufstieg und Niedergang der Römischen Welt II.36.2, pp. 717–773.
 Smith, Andrew (1974) Porphyry's Place in the Neoplatonic Tradition. A Study in post-Plotinian Neoplatonism, The Hague, Nijhoff.
 Zuiddam, B. A. "Old Critics and Modern Theology," Dutch Reformed Theological Journal'' (South Africa), xxxvi, 1995, No. 2.

External links 

 
 
 
 
 Porphyry Malchus (mathematician) – entry in MacTutor History of Maths Archives.
 .
 Περὶ τοῦ ἐν Ὀδυσσείᾳ τῶν Νυμφῶν Ἄντρου (The Cave of the Nymphs in the Odyssey), original Greek text.
 Εἰσαγωγὴ εἰς τὴν Ἀποτελεσματικὴν τοῦ Πτολεμαίου (Introduction to Ptolemy's Tetrabiblos), original Greek text.
 Porphyry, On Abstinence from Animal Food, Book I, translated by Thomas Taylor.
 Porphyry, On Abstinence from Animal Food, Book II, translated by Thomas Taylor.
 Porphyry, On Abstinence from Animal Food, Book III, translated by Thomas Taylor.
 Porphyry, On Abstinence from Animal Food, Book IV, translated by Thomas Taylor.
 Porphyry, On the Cave of Nymphs, translated by Thomas Taylor.
 Porphyry, Auxiliaries to the Perception of Intelligible Natures, translated by Thomas Taylor.
 Porphyry, Isagoge, translated by Octavius Freire Owen.
 The Isagoge, or Introduction of Porphyry, translated by Thomas Taylor with an extensive preface by the translator.
 Porphyry, On the Life of Plotinus
 Porphyry, Comments on the Book of Daniel.
 Additional texts, edited by Roger Pearse
 

234 births
305 deaths
3rd-century Romans
4th-century Romans
3rd-century philosophers
Commentators on Aristotle
Commentators on Plato
Pagan anti-Gnosticism
Late Antique writers
Neoplatonists
Ancient Roman philosophers
Roman-era students in Athens
People from Tyre, Lebanon
Phoenician philosophers
Critics of Christianity
Critics of Judaism
Historians of Phoenicia
3rd-century Phoenician people
Converts to pagan religions from Christianity
Ancient Greek music theorists